The 2018 Temple Owls football team represents Temple University in the 2018 NCAA Division I FBS football season. The Owls were led by second-year head coach Geoff Collins during the regular season and play their home games at Lincoln Financial Field. They are members of the East Division of the American Athletic Conference. They finished the season 8–5, 7–1 in AAC play to finish in 2nd place in the East Division. They were invited to play in the Independence Bowl, where they lost to Duke.

On December 7, 2018, head coach Geoff Collins left for the head coaching job at Georgia Tech. Tight ends coach Ed Foley led the Owls in the Independence Bowl. On December 13, the Owls initially named Miami defensive coordinator Manny Diaz as their new head coach. However, on December 30, Diaz went back to Miami to become their new head coach following Mark Richt's sudden retirement.

Previous season
The Owls finished the 2017 season 7–6, 4–4 in AAC play to finish in third place in the East Division. They were invited to the Gasparilla Bowl where they defeated FIU.

Preseason

Award watch lists
Listed in the order that they were released

AAC media poll
The AAC media poll was released on July 24, 2018, with the Owls predicted to finish in third place in the AAC East Division.

Schedule

Personnel

Coaching staff

Roster

2018 recruiting class

Game summaries

Villanova

Buffalo

at Maryland

Tulsa

at Boston College

East Carolina

at Navy

Cincinnati

at UCF

at Houston

Doak Walker Award candidate Ryquell Armstead, playing on a sore ankle and missing part of the game to have his hand x-rayed, tied a career-best with 210 yards rushing and became the first college player in two years with six rushing touchdowns in a game. He was named conference offensive player of the week, and college offensive player of the week by three groups. This moved him from seventh to third on the AAC's all-time rushing touchdown list with 33, and from seventh to fifth on the rushing yards list with 2,692. On Temple's lists, he also passed Jahad Thomas for touchdowns, 100+ yard games, and career yards—also passing Anthony Anderson and Matt Brown in the latter category—to reach third, tied for fourth with Matt Brown, and fourth respectively all-time.

South Florida

at UConn

vs. Duke–Independence Bowl

Awards and honors

National Awards
The Sporting News All-American Team
Isaiah Wright - Returner

Conference Awards

American Athletic Conference Players of the Year

The American - Special Teams Player of the Year
Isaiah Wright

American Athletic Conference All-Conference Team

First Team
Ryquell Armstead, RB
Shaun Bradley, LB
Michael Dogbe, DT
Delvon Randall, S
Rock Ya-Sin, CB
Isaiah Wright, KR

Second Team
Ventell Bryant, WR 
Jovahn Fair, OL

NFL Players

NFL Draft Combine

One Temple player was invited to participate in the 2018 NFL Scouting Combine.

† Top performer

2019 NFL Draft

Following the season, the following members of the Temple football team were selected in the 2019 NFL Draft.

In addition to the draft selections above, the following Temple players signed NFL contracts after the draft.

References

Temple
Temple Owls football seasons
Temple Owls football